Zedekiah, was the twentieth and final King of Judah before the destruction of the Jewish kingdom by King Nebuchadnezzar II of Babylon. His birth name was Mattaniah/Mattanyahu (Mattanyāhū, "Gift of God";). 

After the siege of Jerusalem in 597 BC, Nebuchadnezzar II deposed King Jeconiah and installed Mattanyahu (his uncle) as king of Judah, changing his name to Zedekiah. The prophet Jeremiah was his counselor, yet he did not heed the prophet and his epitaph is "he did evil in the sight of the Lord".

William F. Albright dates the start of Zedekiah's reign to 598 BC, while Edwin R. Thiele gives the start in 597 BC. On that reckoning, Zedekiah was born in c. 617 BC or 618 BC, being twenty-one on becoming king. Zedekiah's reign ended with the siege and fall of Jerusalem to Nebuchadnezzar II, which has been dated to 587 or 586 BC.

Background
The defeat of the Neo-Assyrian Empire in 612 BC at the Battle of Nineveh by the Neo-Babylonian Empire caused upheavals that led to the destruction of the Kingdom of Judah. Egypt, concerned about the new threat posed by the Babylonians, moved northward to support Assyria. It set on the march in 608 BC, moving through Judah. King Josiah attempted to block the Egyptian forces and fell mortally wounded in battle at Megiddo. Josiah's younger son Jehoahaz was chosen to succeed his father on the throne. Three months later the Egyptian pharaoh Necho II, returning from the north, deposed Jehoahaz in favor of his older brother, Jehoiakim. Jehoahaz was taken back to Egypt as a captive.

After the Babylonians defeated the Egyptians at the Battle of Carchemish in 605 BC, Nebuchadnezzar II besieged Jerusalem. Jehoiakim changed allegiances to avoid the destruction of Jerusalem. He paid tribute from the treasury, some artifacts from the temple, and some of the royal family and nobility were taken as hostages. The subsequent failure of the Babylonian invasion into Egypt undermined Babylonian control of the area, and after three years, Jehoiakim switched allegiance back to the Egyptians and ceased paying the tribute to Babylon. Because of this, Nebuchadnezzar II invaded Judah again in 599 BC, and again laid siege to Jerusalem. In 598 BC, Jehoiakim died during the siege and was succeeded by his son Jeconiah (also known as Jehoiachin). Jerusalem fell within three months. Jeconiah was deposed by Nebuchadnezzar, who installed Zedekiah, Jeconiah's uncle, in his place.

Life and reign

According to the Hebrew Bible, Zedekiah was twenty-one years old when he was made king of Judah by Nebuchadnezzar II in 597 BC. This is in agreement with a Babylonian chronicle, which states,The seventh year: In the month Kislev the king of Akkad mustered his army and marched to Hattu. He encamped against the city of Judah and on the second day of the month Adar he captured the city [and] seized [its] king. A king of his own choice he appointed in the city [and] taking the vast tribute he brought it into Babylon.

The kingdom was at that time a tributary to Nebuchadnezzar II. Despite the strong remonstrances of Jeremiah, Baruch ben Neriah and other family and advisors—and ignoring the example of his older brother Jehoiakim—Zedekiah entered into an alliance with Pharaoh Hophra of Egypt and revolted against Babylon. Nebuchadnezzar responded by invading Judah. Nebuchadnezzar began a siege of Jerusalem in December 589 BC. During this siege "every worst woe befell the city, which drank the cup of God's fury to the dregs".

After laying siege to the city for about thirty months, Nebuchadnezzar finally succeeded in capturing Jerusalem in 586 BC. Zedekiah and his followers attempted to escape, making their way out of the city, but were captured on the plains of Jericho and taken to Riblah. There, Zedekiah saw his sons put to death. Then his eyes were put out and he was loaded with chains and carried captive to Babylon, where he remained a prisoner until he died.

After the fall of Jerusalem, Nebuchadnezzar sent Nebuzaradan to destroy the city. It was plundered and razed to the ground, and Solomon's Temple was destroyed. Only a small number of vinedressers and husbandmen were permitted to remain in the land.

Aftermath
Upon the fall of Jerusalem, the former Kingdom of Judah was absorbed into the Neo-Babylonian Empire and reorganized to become Yehud province. Nebuchadnezzar transferred the administrative center from Jerusalem to Mizpah and appointed Gedaliah ben Aḥikam as governor of the province, under the watchful eye of a Babylonian guard.

On hearing this news, all the Jews that were in Moab, Ammon, Edom, and Aram-Damascus returned to Judah. However, the subsequent assassination of Gedaliah led most of the population of Judah to flee to Egypt for safety In Egypt, they settled in Migdol, Tahpanhes, Noph, and Pathros..

Chronological dispute

The Babylonian Chronicles give 2 Adar (16 March), 597 BC, as the date that Nebuchadnezzar captured Jerusalem. At that time, Nebuchadnezzar deposed King Jeconiah and installed Zedekiah—Jeconiah's uncle—in his place. Zedekiah's installation as king by Nebuchadnezzar can therefore be firmly dated to the early spring of 597 BC.

Historically there has been considerable controversy over the date when Jerusalem was captured the second time and Zedekiah's reign came to an end. There is no dispute about the month: it was the summer month of Tammuz (Jeremiah 52:6). The problem has been to determine the year. It was noted above that Albright preferred 587 BC and Thiele advocated 586 BC, and this division among scholars has persisted until the present time. If Zedekiah's years are by accession counting, whereby the year he came to the throne was considered his "zero" year and his first full year in office, 597/596, was counted as year one, Zedekiah's eleventh year, the year the city fell, would be 587/586. Since Judean regnal years were measured from Tishrei in the fall, this would place the end of his reign and the capture of the city in the summer of 586 BC. Accession counting was the rule for most, but not all, of the kings of Judah, whereas "non-accession" counting was the rule for most, but not all, of the kings of Israel.

The publication of the Babylonian Chronicles in 1956 yielded evidence that the years of Zedekiah were measured in a non-accession sense. According to this method, 598/597 BC—the year Zedekiah was installed by Nebuchadnezzar according to Judah's Tishrei-based calendar—is considered to be "year one" of Zedekiah's reign. Therefore, the fall of Jerusalem in his eleventh year would have been in year 588/587 BC, i.e. in the summer of 587 BC.

The Babylonian Chronicles allow the fairly precise dating of the capture of Jeconiah and the start of Zedekiah's reign, and they also give the accession year of Nebuchadnezzar's successor Amel-Marduk (Evil Merodach) as 562/561 BC, which was the 37th year of Jeconiah's captivity according to 2 Kings 25:27. These Babylonian records related to Jeconiah's reign are consistent with the fall of the city in 587 but not in 586, thus supporting Albright's date. Nevertheless, scholars who assume that Zedekiah's reign should be calculated by accession reckoning continue to adhere to the 586 date.

Book of Mormon
According to the Book of Mormon, a religious text in the Latter Day Saint movement, Zedekiah had a son named Mulek, who escaped death and traveled across the ocean to the Americas, where he founded the Mulekite nation. The Mulekites later merged with another Israelite splinter group—the Nephites—to form one nation, which retained the Nephite name.

Genealogical note
Zedekiah (whose name at birth was Mattanyahu) was the third of Josiah's four sons. His three brothers were Eliakim (born c. 634 BCE), Shallum (born c. 633 BCE), and Johanan. Hamutal—the daughter of Jeremiah of Libnah—was mother to Mattanyahu and his younger brother Shallum, while Zebidah—the niece of Pedaiah—was mother to Eliakim.

Shallum succeeded Josiah as king of Judah, under the name Jehoahaz. Shallum was succeeded by Eliakim, under the name Jehoiakim. Jehoiakim was succeeded by his own son Jeconiah. 

Nebuchadnezzar II deposed Jeconiah and installed his uncle Mattanyahu on the throne, under the name Zedekiah. Zedekiah was the last king of Judah before the kingdom was conquered by Babylon and the people exiled.

In films

See also
 Zedekiah's Cave

Notes

References

|-

6th-century BC Kings of Judah
Book of Mormon people
Dethroned monarchs